Zoe Ada Caldwell  (14 September 1933 – 16 February 2020) was an Australian actress. She was a four-time Tony Award winner, winning Best Featured Actress in a Play for Slapstick Tragedy (1966), and Best Actress in a Play for The Prime of Miss Jean Brodie (1968), Medea (1982), and Master Class (1996). Her film appearances include The Purple Rose of Cairo (1985), Birth (2004), and Extremely Loud & Incredibly Close (2011).

She was also known for providing the voice of the Grand Councilwoman in the Lilo & Stitch franchise and in Kingdom Hearts: Birth by Sleep.

Early life
Caldwell was born in Melbourne, and raised in the suburb of Balwyn. Her father, Edgar, was a plumber. Caldwell's mother often took some of the neighbourhood kids to the Elizabethan Theatre in Richmond where they could go backstage and watch rehearsals and performances.

Career
Caldwell began her career in Melbourne in the 1950s and early 1960s, performing with the newly formed Union Theatre Repertory Company (later the Melbourne Theatre Company).

She emigrated to England upon being invited to join the RSC at a time when Charles Laughton was attempting Lear, and Vanessa Redgrave, Eileen Atkins, Albert Finney were among the other newcomers in the company. She played Bianca in the 1959 production of Othello, starring Paul Robeson. Later she played the indomitable Helena, opposite Dame Edith Evans in a production of All's Well That Ends Well. Her career later brought her to the United States, where she was one of the original company of actors under Guthrie's direction at the Tyrone Guthrie Theatre in Minneapolis. At the Guthrie, she played parts such as Ophelia in Hamlet and Natasha in Three Sisters.

A life member of the Actors Studio, Caldwell won four Tony Awards for her performances on Broadway in Tennessee Williams' Slapstick Tragedy, The Prime of Miss Jean Brodie, Medea and Master Class. In the last she portrayed opera diva Maria Callas. In Stratford, Ontario she appeared often, including her role as Cleopatra in Shakespeare's Antony and Cleopatra opposite Christopher Plummer's Mark Antony in 1967.

Her other credits on Broadway include Arthur Miller's The Creation of the World and Other Business in which she played Eve, a one-woman play by William Luce based on the life of Lillian Hellman and a production of Macbeth with Christopher Plummer as Macbeth and Glenda Jackson as Lady Macbeth under Caldwell's direction. Caldwell directed, Off-Broadway, a two-woman play, created by Eileen Atkins, Vita and Virginia, based on the letters between Virginia Woolf and Vita Sackville-West. Atkins played Virginia and Vanessa Redgrave played Vita. Caldwell directed the Broadway production of Othello in the late 1970s with James Earl Jones, Christopher Plummer, and Dianne Wiest. She helmed the American Shakespeare Theatre in Stratford, Connecticut for two limited-run seasons as its Artistic Director in the mid-1980s.

Caldwell also performed on film, most notably as an imperious dowager in Woody Allen's The Purple Rose of Cairo. She voiced the character of the Grand Councilwoman in Disney's Lilo & Stitch, and continued voicing the character in the franchise's later films and in Lilo & Stitch: The Series, as well as in Kingdom Hearts Birth by Sleep. In 2011, she acted in Extremely Loud & Incredibly Close.

Personal life
Caldwell graduated from Methodist Ladies' College, Kew and, much later, received an honorary degree from the University of Melbourne. In 1968, she married Canadian-born Broadway producer Robert Whitehead, a cousin of actor Hume Cronyn. They had two sons and were married until Whitehead's death in June 2002.

Honours
In 1970, Caldwell was appointed an Officer of the Order of the British Empire by The Queen.

Death
Caldwell died in Pound Ridge, New York on 16 February 2020, aged 86, of complications from Parkinson's disease.

Filmography

Film

Television

Theatre credits

Video games

Bibliography

References

External links
 
 
 

1933 births
2020 deaths
Actresses from Melbourne
Australian film actresses
Australian stage actresses
Australian video game actresses
Australian voice actresses
Drama Desk Award winners
Audiobook narrators
Australian Officers of the Order of the British Empire
Tony Award winners
Australian expatriate actresses in the United States
20th-century Australian actresses
21st-century Australian actresses
People from Pound Ridge, New York
Deaths from Parkinson's disease
Neurological disease deaths in New York (state)
People from Balwyn, Victoria